Íñigo López Montaña (born 23 July 1982) is a Spanish professional footballer who plays as a central defender.

Club career
Born in Logroño, La Rioja, López began his career with Atlético Madrid B in the Segunda División B in 2004, going on to spend six seasons in that tier, his next club being Madrid neighbours UD San Sebastián de los Reyes. In 2007, he signed for AD Alcorcón also in the community, appearing in 35 league games in his first year (five goals) but only five in the following.

López was again a regular starter for Alcorcón in 2009–10, and scored a career-best seven goals as the team promoted to Segunda División for the first time ever. He also took part in the memorable Alcorconazo in the round of 32 of the Copa del Rey, in which the club secured the most famous victory in its history after defeating Real Madrid 4–0 at home and 4–1 on aggregate.

In the summer of 2010, López joined Granada CF in the second division, and achieved a second consecutive promotion, also the second in a row for the Andalusians, while contributing four goals. He made his La Liga debut on 1 October 2011 in a 1–0 away loss against Valencia CF, and netted four times during the season – two of those in narrow wins over Athletic Bilbao (1–0, away) and Málaga CF (2–1, at home)– to help the side retain their league status.

López moved abroad for the first time on 19 June 2013, with the 30-year-old signing a two-year contract with PAOK FC from the Super League Greece. He returned to Spain on 23 January of the following year, after being loaned to RC Celta de Vigo for five months.

On 1 August 2014, López agreed to a one-year deal with Córdoba CF, recently promoted to the top flight. He played 21 matches as his team were immediately relegated, and signed for SD Huesca in the second tier on 14 July 2015.

López helped to achieve promotion to the top division in the 2017–18 campaign, but contributed just four appearances to this feat. He subsequently terminated his contract, and signed a one-year deal with fellow league club Extremadura UD after having trained with them since August.

On 31 January 2019, free agent López moved to division two side Deportivo de La Coruña on a six-month deal.

Personal life
López's older brother, Jorge, was also a footballer.

References

External links

1982 births
Living people
Sportspeople from Logroño
Spanish footballers
Footballers from La Rioja (Spain)
Association football defenders
La Liga players
Segunda División players
Segunda División B players
Tercera División players
Las Rozas CF players
Atlético Madrid B players
UD San Sebastián de los Reyes players
AD Alcorcón footballers
Granada CF footballers
RC Celta de Vigo players
Córdoba CF players
SD Huesca footballers
Extremadura UD footballers
Deportivo de La Coruña players
Super League Greece players
PAOK FC players
Spanish expatriate footballers
Expatriate footballers in Greece
Spanish expatriate sportspeople in Greece